The 2018–19 season was Atlético Madrid's 88th season since foundation in 1903 and the club's 82nd season in La Liga, the top league of Spanish football. Atlético competed in La Liga, Copa del Rey, UEFA Champions League and UEFA Super Cup.

The season was the first since the 2010-11 season without Gaby, who departed to Al-Sadd SC in the summer of 2018.

Kits

Players

Transfers

In

Out

Pre-season and friendlies

Competitions

Overview

La Liga

League table

Results summary

Results by round

Matches

Copa del Rey

Round of 32

Round of 16

UEFA Champions League

Group stage

Knockout phase

Round of 16

UEFA Super Cup

Statistics

Squad statistics

1Players from reserve team - Atlético Madrid B.

Goalscorers

1Player from reserve team - Atlético Madrid B.

Clean sheets

Attendances

Awards

References

External links

Atlético Madrid seasons
Atlético Madrid
Atlético Madrid